The Professorship of Comparative Law is a chair in law at the University of Oxford. The current holder of the chair is Birke Häcker.

The chair was founded as the Professorship of Comparative Law in 1948 and was the first chair of comparative law created in the United Kingdom. The chair is linked with a Professorial Fellowship at Brasenose College, Oxford. In 2013, the chair was renamed from Professorship of Comparative Law to Linklaters Professorship of Comparative Law "in recognition of Linklaters' support for Law in Oxford". After the funding arrangement expired at the end of 2017, the chair reverted to its original name on 1 January 2018.

List of Professors of Comparative Law

Professor of Comparative Law
 1948 to 1964: F. H. Lawson
 1964 to 1971: Otto Kahn-Freund
 1971 to 1978: Barry Nicholas
 1979 to 1999: Bernard Rudden

Linklaters Professor of Comparative Law
 2003 to 2015: Stefan Vogenauer
 2016 to 2017: Birke Häcker

Professor of Comparative Law
 2018 to present: Birke Häcker

References

Professorships at the University of Oxford
Professorships in law
1948 establishments in England
Brasenose College, Oxford
Lists of people associated with the University of Oxford